Willem "Wim" van der Voort (24 March 1923 – 23 October 2016) was a Dutch speed skater. At the 1952 Olympics in Oslo Van der Voort was the silver medalist in the men's 1500 meters, finishing 0.2 seconds behind Hjalmar Andersen of Norway. He received a bronze medal at the 1953 World Allround Championships, and silver medals at the 1951 and 1953 European Championships.

References

1923 births
2016 deaths
Dutch male speed skaters
Olympic speed skaters of the Netherlands
Speed skaters at the 1952 Winter Olympics
Olympic silver medalists for the Netherlands
People from 's-Gravenzande
Olympic medalists in speed skating
Medalists at the 1952 Winter Olympics
World Allround Speed Skating Championships medalists
Sportspeople from South Holland